Marianne Crawford Stanley (born April 29, 1954) is an American basketball coach. She previously served as the  head coach of the Washington Mystics and Indiana Fever of the Women's National Basketball Association (WNBA).

Born in Yeadon, Pennsylvania, Stanley played high school basketball at Archbishop Prendergast High School  in Drexel Hill, Pennsylvania.  She was inducted into the Prendergast Hall of Fame in 2014.

After transferring from West Chester State College (now West Chester University), Stanley played collegiate basketball at Immaculata College. The women's basketball team played in six straight AIAW basketball tournament final fours from 1972 to 1977, five straight finals from 1972 to 1976. They won three consecutive national championships from 1972 to 1974. Among her teammates were future prominent women's coaches Theresa Grentz and Rene Portland. The team was featured for its 1970s accomplishments on a SportsCenter special on March 23, 2008.

On January 26, 1975, she played in the first nationally televised women's intercollegiate basketball game. Facing Maryland at Cole Field House, Immaculata won 80–48.

On February 22, 1975 she played in the first women's basketball game played in Madison Square Garden.  Immaculata beat Queens College 65–61.

The story of the basketball team was adapted into a movie, The Mighty Macs, which was released in 2011. The 1972–1974 teams were announced on April 7, 2014 as part of the 2014 induction class of the Naismith Memorial Basketball Hall of Fame, and were formally inducted as a team on August 8, 2014. In 2022, Stanley and Theresa Grentz were inducted into the Naismith Hall for their subsequent accomplishments as college coaches.

Stanley began her coaching career as an assistant at Immaculata under her coach, Cathy Rush. Stanley's first head coach position was at Old Dominion University in 1977–78, in which they won the NWIT tournament.  In 1979 and 1980 the team won the AIAW women's basketball tournament. Stanley took the 1984-85 team to the NCAA Women's Division I Basketball Championship finishing with a 31–3 season.

Stanley later coached at Penn, USC, Stanford and California joining the WNBA as an assistant with the Los Angeles Sparks in 2000. She joined the Mystics in 2001, and was named head coach of the team in 2002. That year Stanley earned WNBA Coach of the Year honors, guiding the Mystics to the Eastern Conference finals. She was also inducted into the Women's Basketball Hall of Fame the same year.

Stanley joined the New York Liberty as an assistant coach in 2004. She returned to the college coaching ranks in Sept.of 2006 as an assistant to C. Vivian Stringer at Rutgers University. They guided the Scarlet Knights to the NCAA finals in 2007.

The WNBA came calling in 2008 and Marianne left to join Coach Michael Cooper staff with the Los Angeles Sparks as an assistant from 2008 through 2009, and rejoined the Mystics as an assistant coach in 2010.

On November 27, 2019, Stanley was introduced as the head coach of the Indiana Fever. Stanley coached parts of three seasons with the team, amassing an 14–49 record before she was fired on May 25, 2022.

Coaching Record

|-
| align="left" |WAS
| align="left" |2002
| 32 || 17 || 15 |||| align="center" |3rd in East || 5 || 3 || 2 ||
| align="center" |Lost in Conference Finals
|-
| align="left" |WAS
| align="left" |2003
| 34 || 9 || 25 || || align="center" | 7th in East ||- ||- ||- ||-
| align="center" | Missed Playoffs
|-
| align="left" |IND
| align="left" |2020
| 22 || 6 || 16 || || align="center" | 5th in East ||- ||- ||- ||-
| align="center" | Missed Playoffs
|-
| align="left" |IND
| align="left" |2021
| 32 || 6 || 26 || || align="center" | 6th in East ||- ||- ||- ||-
| align="center" | Missed Playoffs
|-
| align="left" |IND
| align="left" |2022
| 9 || 2 || 7 || || align="center" | (fired) ||- ||- ||- ||-
| align="center" | –
|-class="sortbottom"
| align="left" |Career
|| ||129 || 40 || 89 |||| || 5 || 3 || 2 || ||

References

External links
 Marianne Stanley Biography from WNBA.com
 https://caselaw.findlaw.com/us-9th-circuit/1142433.html

1954 births
Living people
All-American college women's basketball players
American women's basketball coaches
Basketball coaches from Pennsylvania
Basketball players from Pennsylvania
California Golden Bears women's basketball coaches
Immaculata Mighty Macs women's basketball players
Indiana Fever coaches
Los Angeles Sparks coaches
New York Liberty coaches
Old Dominion Monarchs women's basketball coaches
Penn Quakers women's basketball coaches
People from Yeadon, Pennsylvania
Rutgers Scarlet Knights women's basketball coaches
Sportspeople from Delaware County, Pennsylvania
Stanford Cardinal women's basketball coaches
USC Trojans women's basketball coaches
Washington Mystics head coaches